Season twenty-two of Dancing with the Stars premiered March 21, 2016, on the ABC network. 

On May 24, model Nyle DiMarco and Peta Murgatroyd were crowned champions, while UFC fighter Paige VanZant and Mark Ballas finished in second place, and Good Morning America meteorologist Ginger Zee and Valentin Chmerkovskiy finished third.

Cast

Couples
The cast was revealed on March 8, 2016, on Good Morning America. Edyta Śliwińska returned as a professional dancer this season after an eleven-season hiatus. Also returning to the pro roster were Artem Chigvintsev, Peta Murgatroyd, and Sasha Farber. Actress Jodie Sweetin was the first celebrity revealed on Good Morning America on March 2, 2016, while TV meteorologist Ginger Zee was also revealed on that show two days later. The remaining celebrities and professionals dancers were later revealed, also on Good Morning America, on March 8.

Hosts and judges
Tom Bergeron and Erin Andrews returned as hosts, while judges Carrie Ann Inaba and Bruno Tonioli returned this season. Head judge Len Goodman returned after missing last season, while Julianne Hough, who served as a judge during the previous three seasons, did not. Season 16 runner-up Zendaya returned as a guest judge on April 11. Maksim Chmerkovskiy returned as a guest judge on April 18.

Dance troupe 
Season 22 dance troupe consisted of returning troupe members Jenna Johnson, Hayley Erbert and Alan Bersten, joined by new troupe members Dennis Jauch, Kiril Kulish and Shannon Holtzappfel.

Scoring charts

Notes

 : The couples were scored on a 40-point scale due to the presence of a guest judge.
 : This was the lowest score of the week.
 : This was the highest score of the week.
 :  This couple finished in first place.
 :  This couple finished in second place.
 :  This couple finished in third place.
 :  This couple was in the bottom three, but was not eliminated.
 :  This couple was eliminated.

Highest and lowest scoring performances
The best and worst performances in each dance according to the judges' 30-point scale are as follows. Scores by guest judges are excluded.

Couples' highest and lowest scoring dances
Scores are based upon a potential 30-point maximum. Scores by guest judges are excluded.

Weekly scores
Individual judges' scores in the charts below (given in parentheses) are listed in this order from left to right: Carrie Ann Inaba, Len Goodman, Bruno Tonioli.

Week 1: First Dances
The couples danced the cha-cha-cha, foxtrot, jive, quickstep, or tango. Couples are listed in the order they performed.

Week 2: Latin Night
The couples danced a Latin-inspired routine. The Argentine tango, paso doble, rumba, salsa, and samba were introduced. Couples are listed in the order they performed.

Mark Ballas was unable to perform due to an injury, so Paige VanZant performed with Alan Bersten instead.

Week 3: Most Memorable Year Night
The couples performed one unlearned dance to celebrate the most memorable year of their lives. Contemporary and waltz were introduced. Couples are listed in the order they performed.

Week 4: Disney Night
Individual judges scores in the chart below (given in parentheses) are listed in this order from left to right: Carrie Ann Inaba, Len Goodman, Zendaya, Bruno Tonioli.

The couples performed one unlearned dance to a song from a Disney film. Jazz and the Viennese waltz were introduced. Couples are listed in the order they performed.

Week 5: Switch-Up Night
Individual judges scores in the chart below (given in parentheses) are listed in this order from left to right: Carrie Ann Inaba, Len Goodman, Maksim Chmerkovskiy, Bruno Tonioli.

The celebrities performed one unlearned dance with a different partner selected by the general public. Couples are listed in the order they performed. Due to the nature of the week, no elimination took place this week.

Week 6: Famous Dances Night
The couples performed one unlearned dance that paid tribute to iconic dance performances from films, music videos, or live performances. Bollywood was introduced. Couples are listed in the order they performed.

Week 7: Icons Night
The couples performed one unlearned dance and a team dance to songs from popular musical icons. Couples are listed in the order they performed. Two couples were eliminated at the end of the night.

Week 8: Judges' Team-up Challenge
The couples performed one unlearned dance and a team-up dance with another couple that was designed and coached by one of the three judges. To avoid favoritism, the judges did not score their own teams. Instead, the general public was able to score the team-up dances on a scale from 1 to 10, with an averaged score counting alongside the remaining judges. The score from the public vote is listed fourth on the scores for the team-up dances. Couples are listed in the order they performed.

Week 9: Semifinals
The couples performed one unlearned dance and a trio dance involving an eliminated pro or a member of the troupe. The Charleston was introduced. Couples are listed in the order they performed.

Week 10: Finals
On the first night, the couples performed a redemption dance and a freestyle. On the second night, the couples danced a fusion dance of two previously learned dance styles. Couples are listed in the order they performed. 

Night 1

Night 2

Dance chart
The celebrities and professional partners danced one of these routines for each corresponding week:
 Week 1 (First Dances): One unlearned dance
 Week 2 (Latin Night): One unlearned Latin dance
 Week 3 (Most Memorable Year Night): One unlearned dance
 Week 4 (Disney Night): One unlearned dance
 Week 5 (Switch-Up Night): One unlearned dance
 Week 6 (Famous Dances Night): One unlearned dance
 Week 7 (Icons Night): One unlearned dance & team dances
 Week 8 (Judges' Team-up Challenge): One unlearned dance & team-up challenge
 Week 9 (Semifinals): One unlearned dance & trio dance
 Week 10 (Finals, Night 1): Redemption dance & freestyle
 Week 10 (Finals, Night 2): Fusion dance

Notes

 :  This was the highest scoring dance of the week.
 :  This was the lowest scoring dance of the week.
 :  This couple danced, but received no scores.

Ratings

References

External links

Dancing with the Stars (American TV series)
2016 American television seasons